Rosalia Township is a township in Butler County, Kansas, USA.  As of the 2010 census, its population was 631.

History
Rosalia Township was created in 1871. The township was named after the town of Rosalia, which was named in honor of the wife of its first postmaster.

Geography
According to the USGS, it contains one cemetery.

The streams of De Haas Creek, Middle Branch Little Walnut River and Nicholas Creek run through this township.

Further reading

References

 USGS Geographic Names Information System (GNIS)

External links
 City-Data.com

Townships in Butler County, Kansas
Townships in Kansas